Actebia balanitis is a moth of the family Noctuidae first described by Augustus Radcliffe Grote in 1873. It is found from north-east Alaska and western Yukon east to east central Saskatchewan and north central South Dakota, south to northern Colorado and west to central Washington and the dry interior of British Columbia. The wingspan is 36–40 mm. Adults are on wing from June to August depending on the location. There is one generation per year.

This species has previously been confused with the Palearctic species Actebia squalida, which led to A. squalida to be misreported from North America.

The larvae probably feed on various grasses.

References

Noctuinae
Moths of North America
Moths described in 1852